Dirk de Ridder (born 29 December 1972) is a sailor born in Oudewater, Netherlands, who represented his country at the 2000 Summer Olympics in Sydney. With Roy Heiner as helmsman and Peter van Niekerk as fellow crew member, De Ridder took the 4th place in the Soling.

He has sailed in four The Ocean Race's, in 1997–98 on Merit Cup, 2001–02 on the winning Illbruck Challenge, in 2005–06 on Pirates of the Caribbean and in 2014–15 on Team Brunel.

He was a member of Oracle Racing on USA 17 in the 2010 America's Cup. He sailed for the 2011–13 America's Cup World Series but was banned from the 2013 America's Cup due to being a part of Oracle's cheating during the World Series. De Ridder maintained his innocence, and his original 5-year ban was reduced to 18 months on appeal. He was part of the winning crew for the 2022 6 metre class World Championships.

References

Further reading

External links
 
 
 

1972 births
Living people
People from Oudewater
Dutch male sailors (sport)
Soling class sailors
European Champions Soling
Sailors at the 2000 Summer Olympics – Soling
Olympic sailors of the Netherlands
Volvo Ocean Race sailors
Oracle Racing sailors
2010 America's Cup sailors
World champions in sailing for the Netherlands
6 Metre class world champions
6 Metre class sailors
Sportspeople from Utrecht (province)